Operário Futebol Clube may refer to:
Operário Futebol Clube (Várzea Grande), Brazilian football club from Mato Grosso state
Operário Futebol Clube (MS), Brazilian football club from Mato Grosso do Sul state, (Mato Grosso do Sul was part of Mato Grosso until the 1970s)

See also
CE Operário Várzea-Grandense
Operário Ferroviário Esporte Clube